Ricky Petterd (born 24 July 1988) is a former professional Australian rules footballer who played for the Melbourne Football Club and Richmond Football Club in the Australian Football League (AFL).

He is a state representative footballer from Broadbeach on the Gold Coast, Queensland who made his senior debut with Melbourne in round 5 of 2007, where he had 22 disposals in the midfield and featured in the Demons best player list. He followed up his first game performance with an AFL Rising Star nomination in round 6.

While with Melbourne he had a season-ending injury in round 14 of 2007 against Carlton. He collapsed during the game and could not breathe. Two club doctors realised there was no time to send him to hospital and punctured his chest wall in the change rooms, allowing air to escape from his chest cavity. This in turn allowed his ruptured lung to re-expand, effectively saving his life. He subsequently had surgery to permanently repair the lung.

Petterd suffered another season-ending injury with Melbourne in May 2010, when he suffered a dislocated right shoulder that required surgery and a four-month recovery period. He played only six games in that season.

Petterd joined Richmond in 2013 as a rookie. In his first season with the Tigers he played 12 games, averaging 17 disposals and five marks per game and was then elevated to the senior list at the 2013 national draft.

He announced his immediate retirement from the AFL in September 2015, citing an ongoing foot injury, following 54 matches with Melbourne and 30 with Richmond.

Playing statistics

|- style="background-color: #EAEAEA"
! scope="row" style="text-align:center" | 2007
|
| 15 || 9 || 6 || 2 || 71 || 53 || 124 || 51 || 18 || 0.7 || 0.2 || 7.9 || 5.9 || 13.8 || 5.7 || 2.0
|-
! scope="row" style="text-align:center" | 2008
|
| 15 || 2 || 0 || 0 || 12 || 8 || 20 || 11 || 2 || 0.0 || 0.0 || 6.0 || 4.0 || 10.0 || 5.5 || 1.0
|- style="background-color: #EAEAEA"
! scope="row" style="text-align:center" | 2009
|
| 15 || 18 || 19 || 8 || 159 || 94 || 253 || 103 || 32 || 1.1 || 0.4 || 8.8 || 5.2 || 14.1 || 5.7 || 1.8
|-
! scope="row" style="text-align:center" | 2010
|
| 15 || 6 || 12 || 6 || 49 || 28 || 77 || 32 || 21 || 2.0 || 1.0 || 8.2 || 4.7 || 12.8 || 5.3 || 3.5
|- style="background-color: #EAEAEA"
! scope="row" style="text-align:center" | 2011
|
| 15 || 15 || 18 || 11 || 156 || 67 || 223 || 79 || 59 || 1.2 || 0.7 || 10.4 || 4.5 || 14.9 || 5.3 || 3.9
|-
! scope="row" style="text-align:center" | 2012
|
| 15 || 4 || 0 || 3 || 28 || 15 || 43 || 12 || 11 || 0.0 || 0.8 || 7.0 || 3.8 || 10.8 || 3.0 || 2.8
|- style="background-color: #EAEAEA"
! scope="row" style="text-align:center" | 2013
|
| 13 || 12 || 4 || 4 || 124 || 85 || 209 || 64 || 30 || 0.3 || 0.3 || 10.3 || 7.1 || 17.4 || 5.3 || 2.5
|-
! scope="row" style="text-align:center" | 2014
|
| 13 || 17 || 12 || 5 || 194 || 108 || 302 || 100 || 63 || 0.7 || 0.3 || 11.4 || 6.4 || 17.8 || 5.9 || 3.7
|- style="background-color: #EAEAEA"
! scope="row" style="text-align:center" | 2015
|
| 13 || 1 || 1 || 1 || 10 || 5 || 15 || 7 || 2 || 1.0 || 1.0 || 10.0 || 5.0 || 15.0 || 7.0 || 2.0
|- class="sortbottom"
! colspan=3| Career
! 84
! 72
! 40
! 803
! 463
! 1266
! 459
! 238
! 0.9
! 0.5
! 9.6
! 5.5
! 15.1
! 5.5
! 2.8
|}

References

External links

1988 births
Living people
Melbourne Football Club players
Broadbeach Australian Football Club players
Australian rules footballers from Hobart
Sportspeople from the Gold Coast, Queensland
Australian rules footballers from Queensland
Richmond Football Club players
Casey Demons players